Wesen may refer to:

An alternate spelling of Wezen, the traditional name for the star Delta Canis Majoris
A supernatural being (non-human) from the fantasy-horror TV series Grimm
The German word for "essence", used with reference to Christianity in Ludwig Feuerbach's The Essence of Christianity (German: Das Wesen des Christentums)